The Lake Catherine State Park Prisoner of War Structures are two structures in the campground area of Lake Catherine State Park in Hot Spring County, Arkansas. It is laid out in a zig-zag pattern just south of the campground's main waterfront building, and is oriented with its faces generally directed eastward to the water. The other is an outdoor cooking area (barbecue pit), also built of stone, located a short way west of the wall. Construction of both of these structures was begun in 1942 by crews of the Civilian Conservation Corps, but was interrupted when work ceased due to World War II. Both were then later completed by German prisoners of war who were housed nearby. They are believed to be unique in the state for this construction history.

The structures were listed on the National Register of Historic Places in 1992.

See also
Lake Catherine State Park CCC Cabins
National Register of Historic Places listings in Hot Spring County, Arkansas

References

National Register of Historic Places in Hot Spring County, Arkansas
1942 establishments in Arkansas
Civilian Conservation Corps in Arkansas
Walls
Barbecue
Government buildings completed in 1942
Germany–United States military relations
World War II prisoner of war camps in the United States
World War II on the National Register of Historic Places
Prisoner of War Structures